Irpiciporus is a genus of fungi belonging to the family Polyporaceae.

The species of this genus are found in Europe, Central Asia and Northern America.

Species:

Irpiciporus japonicus 
Irpiciporus litschaueri 
Irpiciporus tanakae

References

Polyporaceae
Polyporales genera